

See also 
 1796 and 1797 United States House of Representatives elections
 List of United States representatives from Tennessee

References 

Tennessee 1797 at-large
Tennessee 1797 at-large
1797 at-large
Tennessee at-large
United States House of Representatives at-large
United States House of Representatives 1797 at-large